The first season Indian TV-series was premiered on ZEE5 in January 2020 starring Nakuul Mehta, Anya Singh, Suchitra Krishnamoorthi, Niki Aneja, Rituraj Singh, and Vivek Mushran. The season was directed by Arif Khan, written by Durjoy Datta and Sumrit Shahi and produced by 11:11 Productions. Never Kiss Your Best Friend was shot in London.

Cast 
Anya Singh as Tanie Brar
Nakuul Mehta as Sumer Dhillion
Nikki Walia as Happy Brar
Nikkita Chadha as Manali
Rituraj Singh as Sumer's Father

Reception 
Heer Kothari from The Free Press Journal gave four star stating " A refreshing web series". Shubham Kulkarni from Koimoi wrote " Nakuul Mehta & Anya Singh Starrer Is A Staple Drama With An Ae Dil Hai Mushkil Hangover To It". Ruchita Mishra from Peeping wrote " Kya pyaar dosti hai?' Nakuul Mehta’s and Anya Singh's friendly rom-com is totally relatable". Arushi Jain from Indian Express wrote" An easy-breezy show on love and friendship".

References

External links 
 Never Kiss Your Best Friend (Season 1) at IMDb
 Never Kiss Your Best Friend (Season 1) at ZEE5

Indian web series
Indian web series by language
Indian romantic drama films